Zsolt Kosz (born 6 July 1992 in Miercurea Ciuc, Romania) is a former competitive figure skater from Romania. He won two bronze medals at the Romanian Figure Skating Championships in 2007 & 2008 . He belongs to the Hungarian minority in Romania.

References

External links
 
 The Figure Skating Corner

Sportspeople from Miercurea Ciuc
Romanian male single skaters
Romanian sportspeople of Hungarian descent
1992 births
Living people